Paramonacanthus is a genus of filefishes native to the Indian and Pacific Oceans.

Species
There are currently 11 recognized species in this genus:
 Paramonacanthus arabicus Hutchins, 1997
 Paramonacanthus choirocephalus (Bleeker, 1852)
 Paramonacanthus cryptodon (Bleeker, 1855)
 Paramonacanthus curtorhynchos (Bleeker, 1855)
 Paramonacanthus filicauda (Günther, 1880)
 Paramonacanthus frenatus (Peters, 1855)
 Paramonacanthus japonicus (Tilesius, 1809)
 Paramonacanthus lowei Hutchins, 1997
 Paramonacanthus matsuurai Hutchins, 1997
 Paramonacanthus nematophorus (Günther, 1870)
 Paramonacanthus nipponensis (Kamohara, 1939)
 Paramonacanthus oblongus (Temminck & Schlegel, 1850)
 Paramonacanthus otisensis Whitley, 1931
 Paramonacanthus pusillus (Rüppell, 1829)
 Paramonacanthus sulcatus (Hollard, 1854)
 Paramonacanthus tricuspis (Hollard, 1854)

References

Monacanthidae
Ray-finned fish genera
Taxa named by Pieter Bleeker